Pseudophoraspis is a genus of cockroaches.

Species
 Pseudophoraspis argillacea Anisyutkin, 1999
 Pseudophoraspis buonluoiensis Anisyutkin, 1999
 Pseudophoraspis clavellata Wang, Wu & Che, 2013
 Pseudophoraspis congrua (Walker, 1868)
 Pseudophoraspis doroshenkoi Anisyutkin, 2005
 Pseudophoraspis fruhrstorferi Shelford, 1910
 Pseudophoraspis gorochovi Anisyutkin, 1999
 Pseudophoraspis grigorenkoi Anisyutkin, 1999
 Pseudophoraspis incurvata Wang, Wu & Che, 2013
 Pseudophoraspis kabakovi Anisyutkin, 1999
 Pseudophoraspis lacrimans Hanitsch, 1933
 Pseudophoraspis marginata Anisyutkin, 1999
 Pseudophoraspis nebulosa (Burmeister, 1838)
 Pseudophoraspis recurvata Wang, Wu & Che, 2013
 Pseudophoraspis testudinaria Hanitsch, 1925
 Pseudophoraspis tramlapensis Anisyutkin, 1999
 Pseudophoraspis truncatulus Anisyutkin, 1999
 Pseudophoraspis uniformis Hanitsch, 1933

References

Encyclopedia of Life entry

Cockroach genera